Proctor Creek Greenway is a trail, now under construction, in northwest Atlanta. The trail will connect  of green space, from Maddox Park near Bankhead MARTA station, passing the Westside Reservoir Park, to the River Trail Park in the far northwest of the city. The trail is anticipated to be around  seven miles in length. The construction cost is around 4 million U.S. dollars.

See also
Cycling infrastructure
10-Minute Walk
Smart growth
Walkability

References

Hiking trails in Atlanta
Transportation in Atlanta
Cycling in Atlanta
Bike paths in Georgia (U.S. state)